Code page 922 (CCSID 922) (also known as CP 922, IBM 00922, and Estonia ISO-8) is a code page used under IBM AIX and DOS to write the Estonian language. It is an extension and modification of ISO/IEC 8859-1, where the letters Ð/ð and Þ/þ used for Icelandic are replaced by the letters Š/š and Ž/ž respectively. This matches the encoding of these letters in Windows-1257 (LST 1590-3) and ISO/IEC 8859-13.

Code page 902 (CCSID 902) is the euro currency update of code page/CCSID 922. In that code page, the "¤" (currency) character at code point A4 is replaced with the "€" (euro) character.

References

922
ISO/IEC 8859
922